The Lima Phillies were a minor league baseball team based in Lima, Ohio. The Lima "Phillies" were a minor league affiliate of the Philadelphia Phillies, playing as members of the Class D level Ohio-Indiana League in 1950 and 1951. The Phillies were preceded in Ohio–Indiana League play by the 1948 Lima Terriers, who were a minor league affiliate of the Chicago White Sox and the 1949 Lima Chiefs. Failing to qualify for the playoffs in each season, the Lima Ohio–Indiana League teams hosted minor league home games at Allen County Park.

History
The 1948 Lima "Terriers" continued play in a newly named league after the Terriers had played the 1947 season as a member of the Class D level Ohio State League, which changed names for the 1948 season. 

In 1948, the Ohio State League expanded beyond the state of Ohio and changed names to become the Class D level Ohio–Indiana League. The Muncie Reds joined seven returning Ohio State League teams in beginning league play on May 2, 1948.

The Lima franchise continued play in 1948, when the Ohio State League changed names. The Lima Terriers were an affiliate of the Chicago White Sox in 1948. The Marion Cubs, Muncie Reds, Newark Yankees, Portsmouth A's, Richmond Roses, Springfield Giants and Zanesville Dodgers joined Lima in league beginning Ohio–Indiana League play on May 2, 1948.

The Terriers finished in last place in the final regular season standings of the new league. With a record of 57–83, Lima ended the 1948 Ohio–Indiana League regular season in eighth place. Managed by Charlie Engle, the Terriers finished 25.5 games behind the first place Zanesville Dodgers and did not qualify for the four–team playoffs, won by Zanesville. Lima's Joe Frisina won the league batting championship, hitting .332.

Continuing Ohio–Indiana League play, the 1949 Lima team again finished in last place under a new nickname. The Lima "Chiefs" played without a major league affiliate. Managed by Grover Hartley and George Kinnamon, the Chiefs had a regular season record of 46–91 to finish in eighth place. Lima finished 34.0 games behind the first place Portsmouth A's and did not qualify for the playoffs, won by the Marion Red Sox.

Lima became a minor league affiliate of the Philadelphia Phillies in 1950, and began play as the Lima "Phillies," missing the Ohio–Indiana League playoffs. With an 52–85 record, the Phillies placed sixth in the eight team league, playing the season under manager Frank McCormick, a former major league All–Star player and 1940 Most Valuable Player. Lima finished 37.0 games behind the first place Marion Red Sox in the regular season standings.

In their final season of play, the 1951 Ohio–Indiana League compacted to become a five–team league to begin the season. The Newark Yankees won the first–half title in a split–season schedule, with the first half-season schedule ending on June 18, 1951. Newark then folded on July 17, 1951, leaving four remaining teams, Lima included, completing the second half of the season. Lima finished fourth and last in the final regular season standings. At the conclusion of the season, the Phillies finished 49.5 games behind the Marion Red Sox in the overall standings with a 41–86 record, playing the season under returning manager Barney Lutz. After a playoff won by the Marion Red Sox, the Ohio–Indiana League permanently folded following the completion of the 1951 season.

Lima, Ohio has not hosted another minor league team. In 2015, the Lima Locos began play as members of the Great Lakes Summer Collegiate League, a summer collegiate baseball league.

The ballparks
In 1948 and 1949, the Lima Terriers and Chiefs played home minor league games at Halloran Park. The ballpark was destroyed by fire in 1949 and a new field was constructed to replace it. The ballpark was in a residential neighborhood on the north side of Lima. The ballpark hosted Baseball Hall of Fame members Josh Gibson, Buck Leonard, Jud Wilson and Ray Brown and the Homestead Grays in an exhibition game on August 28, 1942. Previously, Hall of famers Babe Ruth and Lou Gehrig made an appearance at the park in 1926.

In 1949 and 1950, the Lima Phillies of the Ohio–Indiana League hosted home minor league games at Allen County Park after a new field was built to replace Halloran Park. With a capacity of 3,750, the ballpark was located at 1920 Slabtown Road and had field dimensions of (left–center–right) of 325–425–295. Today, the site houses facilities and acreage for the Allen County Educational Services organization, using the same address. The adjoining public park is called the Allen County Farm Park, with a location of 1582 Slabtown Road.

Timeline

Year–by–year records

Notable alumni

Charlie Engle (1948, MGR)
Don Erickson (1951)
Grover Hartley (1949, MGR)
Barney Lutz (1951, MGR)
Frank McCormick (1950, MGR) 9x MLB All-Star; 1940 NL M.V.P.
Sonny Senerchia (1949)

See also
Lima Terriers playersLima Chiefs playersLima Phillies playeers

References

External links
Lima - Baseball Reference

Defunct minor league baseball teams
Professional baseball teams in Ohio
Defunct baseball teams in Ohio
Baseball teams established in 1950
Baseball teams disestablished in 1951
Philadelphia Phillies minor league affiliates
Ohio-Indiana League teams
Lima, Ohio